Red Light Fever is the debut and only studio album released by musical group Hot Leg, led by singer-songwriter Justin Hawkins, of The Darkness. The album was released in Europe on 9 February 2009 and in the United States on 17 February 2009.

Background
Writing of Red Light Fever began when lead vocalist Justin Hawkins left The Darkness. Several demos were leaked onto the internet mid-2007, leading many people to believe he was releasing a solo album, however, in August 2008 it was announced that Hawkins had formed a band with which to bring his newly penned music to the public again. In January 2009, it was announced via the band's MySpace page that the debut album would be released in Europe on 9 February.

Songs featured on the album include, "Whichever Way You Want to Give It", "You Can't Hurt Me Anymore", "Gay in the 80s", the download-only single "Trojan Guitar" and Christmas 'super-smash' "I've Met Jesus". Promotional song "Heroes" was not included on the album. Other songs on the album include; "Chickens", "Prima Donna" and "Cocktails", their first major single release.

Every track on the record was scored, performed and recorded by Hawkins. The album was mastered by Stephen Marcussen at Marcussen Mastering. Chas Bayfield, formerly of E-Wing, Team Pig and The International Christian Playboys, co-wrote lyrics to the tracks "Cocktails", "Gay in the 80s" and "I've Met Jesus". Hawkins' Eurovision collaborator Beverlei Brown appears on the track "Ashamed".

Track listing

Personnel
Justin Hawkins — lead vocals, lead guitar, keyboards
Pete Rinaldi – lead guitar, backing vocals
Samuel SJ Stokes – bass, backing vocals
Darby Todd – drums, backing vocals

Notes

External links

2009 debut albums
Hot Leg albums